The orienteering events at the 2009 World Games in Kaohsiung was played between 17 and 19 July. 72 orienteers, from 19 nations, participated in the tournament. The orienteering competition took place at Chengcing Lake and in Kaohsiung Museum of Fine Arts.

Participating nations

Medal table

Events

References

External links
 International Orienteering Federation
 Orienteering on IWGA website
 Results
 Entries

 
2009 World Games